The Aston Martin AMB 001 is a sport motorcycle produced by the British manufacturer Aston Martin from 2020. It is Aston Martin's first motorcycle.

Presentation 
The AMB 001, presented in November 2019, is produced in a limited series of one hundred examples in Toulouse, France by the motorcycle manufacturer Brough Superior. It is sold at a price of €108000, which makes it the entry-level model of the English luxury brand.

Technical characteristics 
It uses a structure in carbon fiber and titanium, a double double wishbone fork and it is coated with a painting "Stirling Green" typical of the brand. The two-wheeled AMB 001 receives a V-twin of 997 cc turbocharged with a power of 180 hp.

References

AMB 001
Motorcycles introduced in 2020